The New York and Long Island Traction Company was a street railway company in Queens and Nassau County, New York, United States. It was partially owned by  a holding company for the Long Island Rail Road and partially by the Interborough Rapid Transit Company. The company operated from New York City east to Freeport, Hempstead, and Mineola.

Lines 
The railroad had two main lines.

Mineola Line 
The Mineola Line (now the Nassau Inter-County Express n24 bus route) spanned from Queens Village to Mineola (in Nassau County) along Jamaica Avenue.

Brooklyn-Freeport Line 
The Brooklyn-Freeport Line spanned from Brooklyn to Freeport (also in Nassau County) and ran mostly along Rockaway Boulevard, North Conduit Avenue, Atlantic Avenue and Merrick Road. The  route was mostly replaced by the Q7 and Q85 (operated by MTA Regional Bus Operations) and n4 (operated by Nassau Inter-County Express).

References

Streetcar lines in Queens, New York
Streetcar lines on Long Island
Defunct public transport operators in the United States
Defunct New York (state) railroads
Companies affiliated with the Long Island Rail Road
Predecessors and affiliates of the Interborough Rapid Transit Company

Railway companies disestablished in 1926